Namkhaidorjiin Bayarmaa (born June 1, 1978 in Ulaanbaatar) is a Mongolian weightlifter. Bayarmaa made her official debut for the 2004 Summer Olympics in Athens, where she competed for the women's lightweight class (58 kg). She finished only in fourteenth place by five kilograms short of her record from Greece's Charikleia Kastritsi, with a total of 195.0 kg (87.5 in the snatch, and 187.5 in the clean and jerk).

At the 2008 Summer Olympics in Beijing, Bayarmaa switched to heavier class by competing in the women's 63 kg division. Bayarmaa placed tenth in this event, as she successfully lifted 90 kg in the single-motion snatch, and hoisted 123 kg in the two-part, shoulder-to-overhead clean and jerk, for a total of 213 kg.

References

External links
 
NBC 2008 Olympics profile 

1978 births
Living people
Olympic weightlifters of Mongolia
Weightlifters at the 2004 Summer Olympics
Weightlifters at the 2008 Summer Olympics
Weightlifters at the 2002 Asian Games
Weightlifters at the 2006 Asian Games
Weightlifters at the 2010 Asian Games
Sportspeople from Ulaanbaatar
Mongolian female weightlifters
Asian Games competitors for Mongolia
20th-century Mongolian women
21st-century Mongolian women